Francisco Hércules de Araújo (born 23 January 1988), known commonly as Pio, is a Brazilian footballer who plays for Água Santa as a midfielder. He became part of the Red Bull Bragantino squad when Red Bull Brasil merged with Clube Atlético Bragantino in April 2019.

Career statistics

References

External links

1988 births
Living people
Brazilian footballers
Brazilian expatriate footballers
Association football midfielders
Campeonato Brasileiro Série A players
Campeonato Brasileiro Série B players
Campeonato Brasileiro Série C players
Campeonato Brasileiro Série D players
Primeira Liga players
Fortaleza Esporte Clube players
Associação Desportiva Recreativa e Cultural Icasa players
Treze Futebol Clube players
ABC Futebol Clube players
Guaratinguetá Futebol players
Atlético Monte Azul players
Gil Vicente F.C. players
Mirassol Futebol Clube players
Botafogo Futebol Clube (PB) players
Clube Atlético Linense players
Ceará Sporting Club players
Centro Sportivo Alagoano players
Red Bull Brasil players
Red Bull Bragantino players
Esporte Clube Água Santa players
Brazilian expatriate sportspeople in Portugal
Expatriate footballers in Portugal
Sportspeople from Fortaleza